Something Heavy Going Down is the third live album by Dutch hard rock band Golden Earring, released in 1984.

Track listing
All songs written by Hay and Kooymans except where noted.

"Long Blond Animal" - 6:16
"Twilight Zone" (Kooymans) - 9:37
"When the Lady Smiles" - 6:08
"Future" (Kooymans) - 7:00
"Something Heavy Going Down" - 4:37
"Enough Is Enough" - 4:10
"Mission Impossible" (Kooymans) - 8:49
"Radar Love" - 9:33
"Clear Night Moonlight" - 6:23

Personnel
George Kooymans - guitar, vocals
Rinus Gerritsen - bass guitar, keyboards
Barry Hay - guitar, vocals
Cesar Zuiderwijk - drums

Production
Producers: Golden Earring, Shell Schellekens
Mixing: John Smit, John Smith

Charts

References

Golden Earring live albums
1984 live albums